Rocky Dawuni is a Ghanaian singer, a three-time Grammy-nominee, songwriter and record producer who performs his signature 'Afro Roots' sound which is a mixture of Reggae, Afrobeat, Highlife and Soul music. He currently lives between Ghana and Los Angeles.

Rocky is a two-time Grammy nominated musician and activist.

Music career

Dawuni got acquainted with Reggae in Ghana when he heard a military band performing one of Bob Marley's compositions in Michel Camp; a military barracks where he grew up. Dawuni started the annual "Independence Splash" festival, which is held in Ghana on Ghanaian Independence Day, March 6.

Dawuni has recorded eight full-length albums.  His sixth studio album titled Branches of The Same Tree was nominated for a Grammy Award for Best Reggae Album in December 2015 for the 58th Annual Grammy Awards, released 31 March 2015 making him the first nominee from his home country of Ghana. Songlines Magazine named the Branches of Same Tree album in the top 10 most essential reggae albums of all time. Inspired by the soulful beats of Fela Kuti and Bob Marley, the album highlighted Dawuni's ability to communicate uplifting messages to the hear of millions.

Beats of Zion, the 2019 single by Rocky, which was released January 25  is a precursor to his 7th studio album which also bears the same title and featured Ghana's dancehall star, [Stonebwoy]. The last video for the albums is "Champion Arise", which was named "Top Tune of the Day" on premier National Public Radio Station KCRW.

In June 2019 Rocky released the new single "Modern Man", remixed by Gaudi. His 8th studio release, Voice of Bunbon, Vol. 1 was nominated during the Grammy Award for Best Global Music Album in the 64th Annual Grammy Awards, making Rocky a multi-Grammy nominee in 2022. Three music videos were released for the EP including "Ghost Town", which was shot by photographer Casey Bridges (son of actor Beau Bridges). The music video "Beautiful People" from the album was shot in Rocky's home village of Bunbon by Ghanaian cinematographer, Slingshot.

Rocky released the music video for Woara (which translates as "you or it's you" in Twi) in September 2021. It was sung in the local Akan dialect, Twi. Woara is a love song with a call and response style to express the beauty and triumph of being in love.

In 2022, Dawuni got his third Grammy nomination, thus the Best Global Music Performance for his work “Neva Bow Down” featuring Blvk H3ro.

He has had two previous nominations in 2015 and 2021.

Activism and goodwill

The musician and activist who is known to straddle the boundaries between Africa, the Caribbean and the U.S. to create sounds that unite generations and cultures works to foster global peace. Dawuni has shared the stage with Stevie Wonder, Peter Gabriel, Bono, Jason Mraz, Janelle Monáe and John Legend, among many others. Named one of Africa's Top 10 global stars by CNN.

Dawuni's stature as a cultural diplomat and successful melding of music and activism have led him to become a spokesperson for various global causes. He is a United Nations Goodwill Ambassador for Africa for UN Environment and is a Global Ambassador for the UN Foundation's Clean Cooking Alliance alongside actress Julia Roberts and Chef José Andrés.

Rocky was named the Global Ambassador for the World Day of African and Afrodescendant Culture recognized by UNESCO, through which he uses his music to shine a light on crucial issues facing humanity across the globe.

Discography

Videography

Music featured in movies

Music featured on television

Music featured on video games

External links
 Official Website

References

Ghanaian reggae musicians
Ghanaian male singer-songwriters
21st-century Ghanaian male singers
21st-century Ghanaian singers
Ghanaian Rastafarians
Living people
1969 births
20th-century Ghanaian male singers